The 1984 Australia rugby union tour of Fiji was a series of 3 matches played in May 1984 by Australia in Fiji.


Results

Touring party
Manager: Chilla Wilson
Assistant Manager/Coach: Alan Jones
Hon. Doctor: Sr. S. Sugarman
Captain: Andrew Slack (QLD)
James Black (NSW)
Matt Burke (NSW)
Bill Calcraft (NSW)
Bill Campbell (QLD)
David Campese (ACT)

Paul Cox (NSW)
Mark Ella (NSW)
Nick Farr-Jones (NSW)
Peter FitzSimons (NSW)
Peter Grigg (QLD)
Ross Hanley (QLD)
Nigel Holt (QLD)
Tim Lane (QLD)
Tom Lawton (QLD)
Cameron Lillicrap (QLD)
Peter Lucas (NSW)
Michael Lynagh (QLD)
Mark McBain (QLD)
Andy McIntyre (QLD)
Brendan Moon (QLD)
Simon Poidevin (NSW)
Ross Reynolds (QLD)
Chris Roche (QLD)
Topo Rodriguez (NSW)
Greg Martin (QLD) was selected but withdrew through injury

Notes

References 
 
 

Australia
tour
Australia national rugby union team tours
tour
Rugby union tours of Fiji